Warren Miller (April 2, 1847 – December 29, 1920) was a lawyer and Republican politician from West Virginia who served as a United States representative in the 54th and 55th United States Congresses, as well as both houses of the West Virginia legislature Senate and on the West Virginia Supreme Court of Appeals.

Early and family life
Miller was born at Apple Grove in Meigs County, Ohio. Around 1850, his family moved to Millwood, Virginia in Jackson County, in what later became West Virginia, and he received a private education suitable for his class, since Virginia had no public schools at the time. He graduated from the Ohio University at Athens.

Career

Miller taught school and studied law.
He was admitted to the bar and commenced practice in Ripley, West Virginia the county seat, in 1871. He also served as mayor of Ripley in 1871. He became prosecuting attorney for Jackson County and nearby Wirt and Roane counties in 1878 and served until 1890. He was chosen to be a delegate to the 1884 Republican National Convention. He was a member of the West Virginia House of Delegates in 1890 and 1891.

in 1892, his bid to become a judge of the State Supreme Court failed. However, three years later Miller won election to the Fifty-fourth and Fifty-fifth Congresses (March 4, 1895 – March 3, 1899), he was not a candidate for renomination in 1898. He returned to the practice of law and also farmed.

Judge Miller was appointed to the Fifth Judicial Circuit Court of West Virginia, then elected to the court in 1902 and 1903 and 1904 served on  the West Virginia Supreme Court of Appeals. He won election to the West Virginia Senate and served from 1914  to 1918.

Death and legacy

Judge Miller died in Ripley, and was buried in Cottageville Cemetery in Cottageville, West Virginia, both in Jackson County.

See also
United States congressional delegations from West Virginia

References

External links
  Online. September 11, 2007.* 
 The Political Graveyard
 GOvtrack.us

1847 births
1920 deaths
County prosecuting attorneys in West Virginia
Mayors of places in West Virginia
Republican Party members of the West Virginia House of Delegates
Ohio University alumni
People from Ripley, West Virginia
People from Meigs County, Ohio
Justices of the Supreme Court of Appeals of West Virginia
West Virginia circuit court judges
West Virginia lawyers
Republican Party West Virginia state senators
Republican Party members of the United States House of Representatives from West Virginia
19th-century American lawyers